Denophoelus is a genus of cylindrical bark beetles in the family Zopheridae. There is one described species in Denophoelus, D. nosodermoides.

References

Further reading

 
 

Zopheridae
Articles created by Qbugbot